IGas Energy Plc is an independent oil and gas exploration and production company, incorporated and operating in the United Kingdom, with headquarters in London. The company started and incorporated in 2003 to produce natural gas, primarily coalbed methane. It grew by acquiring Nexen Exploration and Star Energy in 2011, and PR Singleton Limited in 2013. Since December 2011 company shares have traded on the London Stock Exchange under the symbol IGAS.

Since its inception, the company has produced from conventional oil and gas, and coalbed methane reservoirs. The company also holds licences in the Gainsborough Trough, which has been its main focus of shale gas exploration since 2010. IGas has permits for, and plans to drill two shale gas test holes in the Bowland Basin in late 2013; IGas does not have permits to hydraulically fracture the test wells.

Barton Moss
During 2013 and 2014, IGas has been carrying out exploratory work for coalbed methane at Barton Moss between Irlam and Peel Green in Salford, Greater Manchester. This has resulted in direct action protests at the site and criticism of Greater Manchester Police's handling of the protest.

Citations

External links
IGas Energy website

Oil and gas companies of the United Kingdom